The Tercera División de Nicaragua is the third division of Nicaraguan football.

It is organized by FENIFUT.

History

League format
The season is divided into two groups.

Teams 2017

References

External links
Web site
Es.

3
Nica